Ove Nylén (born 14 February 1959 in Kumla, Örebro) is a former Swedish swimmer. He finished 13th in 200 m butterfly in the 1980 Summer Olympics.

Clubs
Kristianstads SLS

References
sports-reference

1959 births
Swedish male butterfly swimmers
Living people
Swimmers at the 1980 Summer Olympics
Olympic swimmers of Sweden
People from Kumla Municipality
Sportspeople from Örebro County
20th-century Swedish people